The Walk is the fourth album by American pop rock group Hanson. It was released in Japan on February 21, 2007, in the UK on April 30, in the U.S., Canada, and Mexico on July 24, and in Italy on March 21, 2008. Being the second release of the band's own independent label, 3CG Records, this record is said by the band to be heavier than Underneath.

Track listing
All songs written by Isaac Hanson, Taylor Hanson and Zac Hanson except where noted.
 "Ngi Ne Themba (I Have Hope)" – 0:24
 "Great Divide" – 4:00 (Lead vocals: Taylor Hanson)
 "Been There Before" – 3:33 (Lead vocals: Taylor Hanson)
 "Georgia" – 3:48 (Lead vocals: Taylor Hanson)
 "Watch Over Me" (Isaac Hanson, Zac Maloy, Chris Holmes) – 4:54 (Lead vocals: Isaac Hanson)
 "Running Man" (Zac Hanson, William James McAuley III) – 3:41 (Lead vocals: Zac Hanson)
 "Go" (Zac Hanson, William James McAuley III, Shannon Curfman) – 4:04 (Lead vocals: Zac Hanson)
 "Fire on the Mountain" – 2:42 (Lead vocals: Zac Hanson)
 "One More" – 4:11 (Lead vocals: Taylor Hanson)
 "Blue Sky" – 3:37 (Lead vocals: Taylor Hanson)
 "Tearing It Down" - 3:05 (Lead vocals: Zac Hanson)
 "Something Going Round" – 3:13 (Lead vocals: Taylor and Isaac Hanson)
 "Your Illusion" – 5:01 (Lead vocals: Taylor Hanson)
 "The Walk" – 5:03 (Lead vocals: Zac Hanson)

North American and Italian bonus tracks
 "Got a Hold on Me" (Live Acoustic) (Lead vocals: Taylor Hanson)
 "I've Been Down" (Live Acoustic) (Lead vocals: Taylor Hanson)
 "Something Going Round" (Live Acoustic) (Lead vocals: Taylor and Isaac Hanson)

Japanese bonus tracks
 "In a Way" – 4:04 (Lead vocals: Zac Hanson)
 "I Am" – 3:44 (Lead vocals: Zac Hanson)

Singles
1. "Great Divide" : released November 28, 2006

2. "Go" : released April 19, 2007

Chart positions

Personnel
Craig Alvin – engineer, mixing
Bleu – bass, guitar, production
DD Dliwayo School Choir – choir
CJ Eiriksson – engineer, mixing
Isaac Hanson – vocals, guitar, mixing, production
Taylor Hanson – vocals, piano, keyboards, organ, percussion, mixing, production
Zac Hanson – vocals, drums, percussion, piano, mixing, production
Hanson family – handclapping
Iris Ministries Zimpeto Center Choir – choir
Palesa Khokeletso – choir director
Danny Kortchmar – conga, production
Chris Rezanson – bell, triangle
Kenneth Wyatt – bass, harmonica
Adam Zappa – engineer
Miles Zuniga – guitar

References

Hanson (band) albums
2007 albums
Albums produced by Danny Kortchmar
Cooking Vinyl albums